This list includes properties and districts listed on the California Historical Landmark listing in Siskiyou County, California. Click the "Map of all coordinates" link to the right to view a Google map of all properties and districts with latitude and longitude coordinates in the table below.

|}

References

See also

List of California Historical Landmarks
National Register of Historic Places listings in Siskiyou County, California

  

+Landmarks  
List of California Historical Landmarks